Dallina is a genus of small to average size lampshells (maximum  long). It is known since the Miocene.

Description 
Small to large, triangular to subquadrangular in outline; rectimarginate to paraplicate; beak erect, without beak ridges; foramen small to large, mesothyrid, attrite, symphytium concave. Hinge teeth small, weak; pedicle collar very short. Cardinalia lamellar with excavate inner and outer hinge plates separated by narrow crural bases; inner hinge plates converging on median septum to form V-shaped septalium; cardinal process not differentiated; median septum low anteriorly, extending beyond midvalve; adult loop teloform.

Taxonomy 
Nine extant species are recognized (though one has recently been synonymized), these are listed below:

 Dallina septigera (Lovén, 1845), Type species of genus, from northeastern Atlantic.
 Dallina elongata Hatai, 1940, recorded from Sea of Japan.
 Dallina eltanini Foster, 1974, southern Pacific, near Antarctica.
 Dallina floridana (Pourtalès, 1867), recorded from the Gulf of Mexico and Bahamas.
 Dallina obessa Yabe & Hatai, 1934, recorded from Sea of Japan.
 Dallina parva Cooper, 1981, recorded from northeast Atlantic (Bay of Biscay).
 Dallina profundis Konjukova, 1957 (junior synonym of Glaciarcula spitzbergensis)
 Dallina raphaelis (Dall, 1970), recorded from off Japan.
 Dallina tasmaniaensis Verhoeff, 2023, southeastern Australia.
 Dallina triangularis Yabe & Hatai, 1934, recorded from off Japan and possibly Lau Ridge.

References 

Terebratulida
Brachiopod genera
Extant Miocene first appearances